Simbang is a village in the town of Mandiraja, Banjarnegara Regency, Central Java Province, Indonesia. This village has an area of 158,50 hectares and a population of 1.929 inhabitants in 2010.

References

External links
 Banjarnegara Regency Official Website
 BPS Kabupaten Banjarnegara

Banjarnegara Regency
Villages in Central Java